Maqewa Island (also written Manggewa) is an island in Fiji, a member of the Ringgold Isles, which forms an outlier group to the northern island of Vanua Levu.

See also

 Desert island
 List of islands

References

Uninhabited islands of Fiji
Ringgold Isles